HMS Saltash (J62) was a Hunt-class minesweeper of the Aberdare sub-class built for the Royal Navy during World War I. She was not finished in time to participate in the First World War and survived the Second World War to be sold for scrap in 1947.

Design and description
The Aberdare sub-class were enlarged versions of the original Hunt-class ships with a more powerful armament. The ships displaced  at normal load. The ships' complement consisted of 74 officers and ratings.

The ships had two vertical triple-expansion steam engines, each driving one shaft, using steam provided by two Yarrow boilers.

The Aberdare sub-class was armed with a quick-firing (QF)  gun forward of the bridge and a QF twelve-pounder (76.2 mm) anti-aircraft gun aft. Some ships were fitted with six- or three-pounder guns in lieu of the twelve-pounder.

Construction and career
Saltash, named after the town of Saltash in south-east Cornwall, was built by Murdoch and Murray of Port Glasgow, launched 25 June 1918 and served through the last few months of World War I as well as through all of World War II. She was involved in the evacuation of Dunkirk, during which, on 1 June 1940, she took on board the crew of HMS Havant, that ship having been heavily damaged by German aircraft after they had successfully evacuated some 3,000 troops themselves.

Saltash later returned to northern France as part of the Normandy landings in 1944. She was decommissioned on 13 March 1947.

A fictitious HMS Saltash appears in Nicholas Monsarrat's novel of the Royal Navy during World War II, The Cruel Sea.

Notes

References

External links 
  Chronologies of War Service of Royal Navy Warships
 Clydebuilt Database

 

Hunt-class minesweepers (1916)
1918 ships